Dmitri Vladimirovich Rybakin (born 27 December 1982) is a former Russian professional football player.

Club career
He played  seasons in the Russian Football National League for FC Dynamo Bryansk in 2006.

See also
Football in Russia

References

1982 births
Living people
Russian footballers
Association football defenders
FC Dynamo Bryansk players
FC Lokomotiv Kaluga players
FC Spartak Tambov players